Still, Here is the tenth studio album by Portland guitarist Marisa Anderson, released September 23, 2022, by Thrill Jockey. The eight-track album consists of six original compositions and two arrangements of traditional songs. Anderson recorded every instrument, including multiple keyboards and numerous guitars, herself.

Background 
The album was announced June 16 along with the release of lead single "Waking". Second single "La Llorona", an arrangement of a traditional Mexican song named after the legendary spirit of Hispanic-American folklore, was released August 8. Third single "The Fire This Time", named after James Baldwin's 1963 essay collection The Fire Next Time, was released September 8. Anderson first released "The Fire This Time" for two weeks on her Bandcamp page, donating over $2,500 of proceeds to the Minnesota Freedom Fund.

Anderson called the making of the album "probably a four-year process", saying that after her previous solo album Cloud Corner, she wasn't sure she had anything new to say. She "needed a little time and distance", leading to her intervening collaborative albums – The Quickening with Jim White and Lost Futures with William Tyler – to give her a change of pace. She said she thinks that move worked, that it "shook some other things loose and now I feel inspired again – and I'm writing new stuff all the time, which is fun." Per Anderson, "The Fire This Time" is about the murder of George Floyd and was written while protests were ongoing, with police sirens audible in the recording and the music representing her "visceral, horrified response to those events".

Style 
Per Dusteds Jennifer Kelly, the album is, "as always, lovely, serene and rooted in blues and folk traditions." Pitchforks Andy Cush calls her fingerpicking technique reminiscent of both Piedmont blues and flamenco, and notes some tracks which take influence from early Philip Glass, Mississippi Fred McDowell, and sunshine pop. Cush says every song has its own identity.

Reception

Track listing

Personnel 
 Marisa Anderson – composer, arranger, producer, recording engineer, nylon-string guitar, steel-string guitar, electric guitar, pedal steel guitar, requinto guitar, electric piano, synthesizer
 Jesse Munro Johnson – mixing engineer
 Amy Dragon – mastering engineer
 Dante Korinto – photography
 Daniel Castrejon – design

References 

2022 albums
Marisa Anderson albums
Thrill Jockey albums
Blues albums by American artists
Folk albums by American artists